In enzymology, a selenate reductase is an enzyme that catalyzes the chemical reaction

selenite + H2O + acceptor  selenate + reduced acceptor

The 3 substrates of this enzyme are selenite, H2O, and acceptor, whereas its two products are selenate and reduced acceptor.

This enzyme belongs to the family of oxidoreductases.  The systematic name of this enzyme class is selenite:reduced acceptor oxidoreductase.

References

 
 
 
 

EC 1.97.1
Enzymes of unknown structure